No. 205 Squadron was a Royal Air Force unit formed on 1 April 1918. Prior to this it had existed as No. 5 Squadron of the Royal Naval Air Service (RNAS). In 1929, it became the first RAF squadron to be permanently based in Singapore, taking as its motto Pertama di Malaya ("First in Malaya"). No. 205 Squadron operated during World War II and the Cold War before disbanding on 31 October 1971.

History

Formation and World War I
No. 5 Squadron of the Royal Naval Air Service was formed at Dover on 2 August 1915 from elements of No. 4 Squadron RNAS, which had relocated to Eastchurch. However, in October 1915, No. 5 Squadron ceased to exist as it was absorbed into RNAS Dover.

On 31 December 1916, 'B' Squadron of No. 5 (Naval) Wing was redesignated No. 5 (Naval) Squadron. It operated Sopwith 1½ Strutters, making bombing raids on Belgian ports and German airfields. In August 1917, the squadron was equipped with DH.4s. No. 5 (Naval) Squadron was attached to 5th Brigade of the Royal Flying Corps in February 1918. On 1 April 1918, at Bois de Roche, France (some sources say Petite-Synthe), it transferred to the Royal Air Force and was redesignated No. 205 Squadron RAF. No. 205 Squadron's operations continued with raids against ports and attacks on German airfields until the end of the war. In September 1918, it was re-equipped with DH.9As.

It produced at least three notable aces, in Euan Dickson Charles Bartlett, and Walter Naylor.

Between the wars
The squadron relocated to La Louveterie in Belgium following the end of hostilities before moving to Hucknall Airfield in March 1919, where it was first reduced to cadre status and disbanded on 22 January 1920. 
Reformed at RAF Leuchars on 15 April 1920, the squadron operated as a fighter-reconnaissance unit with Parnall Panthers. It was disbanded on 1 April 1923, after being redesignated to No. 441 Flight. 
The squadron was reformed when the RAF's Far East Flight was redesignated No. 205 Squadron on 8 January 1929, becoming the Air Force's first squadron to be permanently based at Singapore. It carried out survey flights with Supermarine Southamptons, re-equipping with Short Singapores in April 1935. From 1929 to 1930, the squadron commander was Group Captain H M Cave-Browne-Cave. Cave-Browne-Cave had previously been Officer Commanding the Far East Flight.

World War II

At the outbreak of World War II, No. 205 Squadron flew patrols over the approaches to Singapore and the Indian Ocean, employing bases in Ceylon and the Nicobar Islands as outstations. It was re-equipped with PBY Catalinas in 1941 before being withdrawn from Singapore and relocated to Java, leaving three aircraft at Selatar Air Base. 
One of 205 Squadron's Catalinas became the first Allied casualties of the war with Japan. According to Japanese reports found after the war Flying Officer Edwin Beddell's Catalina had spotted the Japanese invasion fleet approaching Northern Malaya when he was attacked by a catapult-launched float plane which must have damaged his radio. A short time later Beddell's plane was attacked by five Ki-27 which shot him down. The Japanese report states the Catalina exploded 400 feet above the sea. When Japanese forces invaded Java the squadron retired to the south of the island and then to Australia, where it disbanded on 31 March 1942.
Reformed in Ceylon on 23 July 1942, the squadron's Catalinas flew anti-submarine and air-sea rescue patrols out of Koggala for the remainder of the war.

Cold War

No. 205 Squadron continued Catalina operations from its base at Koggala until 1949, when it was re-equipped with Sunderland Vs and returned to Seletar, Singapore. During 1950 and 1951, a detachment was based at Iwakuni in Japan, carrying out patrols along the Korean coast. Detachments were also based at RAF Trincomalee, RAF Kai Tak and RAF Changi. Squadron Headquarters was moved to Changi in March 1959, leaving a detachment of Sunderlands at Seletar. The unit then began converting to land-based maritime patrol operations, equipped with Avro Shackletons. On 15 May 1959 the squadron flew the RAF's last Sunderland operation out of RAF Seletar, Singapore. No. 205 Squadron continued Shackleton patrols until it disbanded on 31 October 1971.

Aircraft operated

See also
List of Royal Air Force aircraft squadrons
Cathay Pacific VR-HEU

References

Notes

Bibliography

 Bowyer, Michael J.F. and John D.R. Rawlings. Squadron Codes, 1937–56. Cambridge, UK: Patrick Stephens Ltd., 1979. .
 Flintham, Vic and Andrew Thomas. Combat Codes: A full explanation and listing of British, Commonwealth and Allied air force unit codes since 1938. Shrewsbury, Shropshire, UK: Airlife Publishing Ltd., 2003. .
 Halley, James J. The Squadrons of the Royal Air Force & Commonwealth 1918–1988. Tonbridge, Kent, UK: Air Britain (Historians) Ltd., 1988. .
 Jefford, C.G. RAF Squadrons, a Comprehensive record of the Movement and Equipment of all RAF Squadrons and their Antecedents since 1912. Shrewsbury, Shropshire, UK: Airlife Publishing, 1988 (second edition 2001). .
 Moyes, Philip J.R. Bomber Squadrons of the RAF and their Aircraft. London: Macdonald and Jane's (Publishers) Ltd., 2nd edition 1976. .
 Rawlings, John D.R. Coastal, Support and Special Squadrons of the RAF and their Aircraft. London: Jane's Publishing Company Ltd., 1982. .
 Shores, Christopher F., et al. Above the Trenches: A Complete Record of the Fighter Aces and Units of the British Empire Air Forces 1915–1920.  Grub Street, 1990. , .
 Smith, Colin. Singapore Burning. Penguin Books, 2005. .

External links
 RAF Squadron history
 Air of Authority Squadron history
 Leslie Tomlin's War at RAF Koggala, Sri Lanka 1942-45

05 Squadron
205
Military of Hong Kong under British rule
Military of British Ceylon
Aircraft squadrons of the Royal Air Force in World War II
1915 establishments in England
1918 establishments in the United Kingdom
Military units and formations of Ceylon in World War II
Military units and formations in British Malaya in World War II
Maritime patrol aircraft units and formations
Military units and formations established in 1915
Military units and formations disestablished in 1971